New Connexion of General Baptists was a revivalist offshoot from the Arminian Baptist tradition, one of two main strands within the British Baptist movement.

History
Formed in 1770, whilst the New Connexion owes its existence to Dan Taylor, the Yorkshire-born General Baptist pastor, its roots can be found among a group of independent Baptist congregations in the east Midlands loosely federated since the 1750s. Because the focal-point of this grouping was the Leicestershire village of Barton-in-the-Beans, near Market Bosworth, the federation came to be known as the Barton Society. Dan Taylor's achievement was to unify the Barton Society's congregations in Leicestershire, Nottinghamshire and Derbyshire, with other Arminian chapels disenchanted with the General Baptist drift towards ’Free Christian’ unorthodoxy. The religious revivalism of the mid 18th century had exacerbated the more orthodox congregations’ frustration. In contrast to the sensibilities of their more liberal counterparts, their “strong evangelistic zeal and strong corporate feeling” was “obviously a child of the Methodist Revival”.

The New Connexion was well organised from the outset and developed well in the emerging urban areas of the Industrial Revolution, particularly in the industrial midlands. By 1817, the year after Taylor's death, the Connexion had around 70 chapels.

By 1798 the Connexion had founded its own academy to train its pastors and lay preachers. Initially, the academy was located in Mile End, the east end of London, before moving to Wisbech, Cambridgeshire, in 1813. The Connexion's academy re-located again in 1855 (to Leicester) and in 1882, as the ‘Midland Baptist College’, to Nottingham. It finally closed around the time of the First World War and its assets were transferred to Rawdon Baptist College (‘The Northern Baptist College’).

The Baptist Union of Great Britain, formed in 1812, did not include General Baptists. However, “in order to allow more churches to join, it had reduced its doctrinal basis to the bare minimum in 1832, simply asking for agreement in the sentiments usually denoted as evangelical. This had resulted in a number of churches from the New Connexion joining”.

After the so-called 'Down Grade Controversy' resulted in the defeat of those Calvinistic theological conservatives like Charles Spurgeon, who were sceptical of the value of modern Biblical criticism, the path was open to greater unity. John Clifford, baptised in a New Connexion chapel and ordained after studying at the New Connexion's Midland Baptist College, became the President of the Baptist Union of Great Britain in 1888. Under his leadership, the New Connexion merged with the Union in 1891. Fittingly for a traditionally non-creedal denomination, no confession of faith was required from either side, Calvinist or Arminian. John Clifford became the first President of the Baptist World Alliance (1905 – 11).

References

English Reformation
Arminian denominations
Baptist denominations in the United Kingdom
Religious organizations established in 1770
Baptist organizations established in the 18th century
Protestant denominations established in the 18th century
1770 establishments in England